Northfield Township is one of 29 townships in Cook County, Illinois, USA.  As of the 2010 census, its population was 85,102. The township office is located at 2550 Waukegan Road (just south of Willow Road) in Glenview. The township was established on April 2, 1850.

Geography

Cities, towns, villages
 Deerfield (south edge)
 Glencoe (west edge)
 Glenview (majority)
 Northbrook (vast majority)
 Northfield (west three-quarters)
 Prospect Heights (east edge)
 Wilmette (west edge; Wilmette Golf Club area)
 Des Plaines (north edge; forest preserves)

Other Community
 Techny at

Adjacent townships
 Moraine Township, Lake County (north)
 West Deerfield Township, Lake County (north)
 New Trier Township (east)
 Niles Township (southeast)
 Maine Township (southwest)
 Wheeling Township (west)
 Vernon Township, Lake County (northwest)

Cemeteries
The township does not maintain any cemeteries. Northfield Township contains these seven cemeteries: North Northfield (owned and operated by the Village of Northbrook), Northfield Union, Oak Wood, Sacred Heart, Saint Johns, Saint Marys, and Sunset Memorial Lawns.

Major highways
  Interstate 94
  Interstate 294
  U.S. Route 41
  U.S. Route 45
  Illinois Route 68

Airports and landing strips
 Northshore Glenbrook Hospital Heliport
 Plaza Heliport

Lakes
 E J Beck Lake
 Citation Lake
 Lake Glenview
 Lake Shermerville

Demographics

Economy

Allstate has its headquarters in Northfield Township.

Political districts
 Illinois's 9th congressional district
 Illinois's 10th congressional district
 State House District 17
 State House District 57
 State House District 58
 State Senate District 9
 State Senate District 29

References
 
 United States Census Bureau 2007 TIGER/Line Shapefiles
 United States National Atlas

External links

 Northfield Township official website
 Northfield Township Road District
 History of Northfield
 City-Data.com
 Illinois State Archives

Townships in Cook County, Illinois
Populated places established in 1850
Townships in Illinois
1850 establishments in Illinois